Tipperary Natural Mineral Water is an Irish brand of mineral water coming from a source at Annerville, Clonmel, County Tipperary, Ireland. Tipperary Water is part of C&C Group, an Irish-owned multinational company.

History
Tipperary Natural Mineral Water Company was founded in 1986 by Nicholas and Patrick Cooney.  The water is pumped from a depth of 100 metres.  In 1987, Tipperary Natural Mineral Water was the first Irish bottled water to qualify for the European Union's Natural Mineral Water status.  In 2012, C&C Group acquired Gleeson Group for €12.4m. In 2016, seeking to cut costs C&C closed the water-bottling plant in Borrisoleigh which employed 140 staff. Production was moved to Clonmel County Tipperary.

In 2019 the former Borrisoleigh water-bottling plant was sold to Oscar Wilde Water, a company owned by entrepreneur John Hegarty.

References

External links
 Official website

Irish drinks
Drink companies of the Republic of Ireland
Bottled water brands
Products introduced in 1986
1986 establishments in Ireland
Mineral water